East Columbus is a district in Columbus, Georgia. The area is roughly bounded by Macon Road to the north, Buena Vista Road to the south, Schatulga Road and Fort Benning to the east, and I-185 to the west.

Neighborhoods
The following are neighborhoods in East Columbus:

Crystal Valley
Englewood
Forest Park
Forest Park II
Gentian
Glen Arden
Hunter Ridge
Kingsridge
Moye Estates
Oakcrest/Roosevelt Heights
PineWood
Schatulga
Sweetwater
Woodbriar
Woodlawn Estates

Columbus metropolitan area, Georgia
Neighborhoods in Columbus, Georgia